R-Evolution is the third and final sculpture in Marco Cochrane's series, The Bliss Project. The work debuted at Burning Man in 2015 and has not yet found a permanent home.

Description and history
In December 2016, activists applied for a permit to display R-Evolution on the National Mall starting in November 2017 for the "Catharsis on the Mall" event, but the permit was denied over fears the turf would be damaged. Although the sculpture was too tall for temporary installations on the Mall, a height variance was issued and later revoked. Undaunted, the group instead applied to exhibit a -tall composite photograph of 27 naked women holding the same pose, which a spokeswoman called "a healing image and it's about making women feel safe in their environments."

See also

 2015 in art
 Truth is Beauty (2013)

References

External links
 

2015 sculptures